Pir (also Romanized as Pīr; also known as Piroo’eyeh, Pīrū, and Pīrū’īyeh) is a village in Dashtab Rural District, in the Central District of Baft County, Kerman Province, Iran. At the 2006 census, its population was 303, in 73 families.

References 

Populated places in Baft County